Marshall Chapman (born January 7, 1949) is an American singer-songwriter and author.

Biography

Early life
Marshall Chapman was born in Spartanburg, South Carolina, United States. She was the daughter of a cotton mill owner. After she attended a concert by Elvis Presley in 1956, she became interested in rock and roll. She was educated at Salem Academy in Winston-Salem, North Carolina. She then graduated from Vanderbilt University in Nashville, Tennessee in 1971.

Career
She embarked upon a music career in the 1970s. Her songs have been recorded by such diverse artists as Conway Twitty, Joe Cocker, Jimmy Buffett, Emmylou Harris, Wynonna, Jessi Colter, John Hiatt, Dion, Olivia Newton-John, Irma Thomas, and Ronnie Milsap. Her song "Betty’s Bein’ Bad" was a hit for Sawyer Brown.

Her 1978 album, Jaded Virgin (Epic), was voted Record of the Year by Stereo Review. In 1998, Marshall and Matraca Berg contributed 14 songs to Good Ol' Girls, a country musical based on the stories of Lee Smith and Jill McCorkle. The musical continues to play theaters throughout the South.

She has written two books. Her memoir, Goodbye, Little Rock and Roller, was published in 2003 by St. Martin's Press. Her second book, They Came to Nashville, was published in 2010 by Vanderbilt University Press – Country Music Foundation Press. It is a 2010 Fall Okra Pick of the Southern Independent Booksellers Association.

Discography
Me, I'm Feelin' Free – Epic/CBS – 1977
Jaded Virgin – Epic/CBS – 1978
Marshall – Epic – 1979
Take It On Home – Rounder – 1982
Dirty Linen – Tall Girl – 1987
Inside Job – Tall Girl – 1991
It's About Time… – Tallgirl/Island/Margaritaville – 1995
Love Slave – Tallgirl/Island/Margaritaville – 1996
Goodbye, Little Rock And Roller – Tall Girl – 2003
Live! The Bitter End – Tall Girl – 2004
Mellowicious! – Thirty Tigers/Tallgirl – 2006
Big Lonesome – Tall Girl – 2011
Blaze Of Glory – Tall Girl – 2013
Songs I Can't Live Without – Tall Girl – 2020

References

External links
Official website 
IMDb

Musicians from Spartanburg, South Carolina
American memoirists
American women country singers
American country rock singers
American country singer-songwriters
Vanderbilt University alumni
Salem Academy alumni
Living people
1949 births
American women memoirists
Guitarists from South Carolina
20th-century American guitarists
Country musicians from South Carolina
20th-century American women guitarists
Singer-songwriters from South Carolina